The Bosphorus Water Tunnel or Bosporus aqueduct is an undersea aqueduct in Istanbul, Turkey, crossing the Bosphorus strait. It was constructed in 2012 to transfer water from the Melen Creek in Düzce Province to the European side of Istanbul.

Need for the aqueduct
With a population of about 15 million, Istanbul is trying to secure its citizens' access to drinking water. Most clean water in Turkey (and, consequently, Istanbul) is located on the Asian borders of the country. Therefore, it is difficult to bring water to Istanbul's Asian side with hundreds of kilometres of pipelines, and another challenge to bring water to the European side of Istanbul with a tunnel dug 85 metres under the sea bed (145 metres under the sea surface) atop an active fault.

Commissioning and finance
The tunnel was commissioned by the Ministry of Forest and Water Management and constructed by an international consortium of Russian and Turkish companies (Mosmetrostroy, ALKE and STFA). The Melen Water Supply Project was funded mainly by JBIC (Japanese Bank for International Cooperation) and partly by DSI (State Hydraulic Works).

Construction
There were two phases to the project: the underwater-tunnel phase and the land-tunnel phase. The underwater phase was done by the TBM (tunnel boring machine) method, and the land part by blasting. The TBM-drilling part of the project was complete in March 2009 and a ceremony was held, with the attendance of ministers, bureaucrats, Russian diplomats and Kadir Topbaş, the mayor of Istanbul. The TBM is specially designed and constructed for this project by the German firm Herrenknecht, and is six metres in diameter. After the tunneling works are finished, the tunnel is being lined by prefabricated concrete segments, after which come nine-metre-long steel pipes with an inside diameter of four metres.

Infrastructure

Being the first stage of the Melen System that cost 2 billion TL, the waterway tunnel was constructed in 1,756 days  and completed on 19 May 2012 without any accident. It will transfer a daily rate of 2.8 million m3 of water, which is two and half times higher than Istanbul's current water consumption.

It is the first tunnel connecting two continents.

There is a large railway project which will connect both sides of Istanbul as well, but it will be through submerged tubes placed on the sea bed and not by tunnelling.

See also 
 Water supply and sanitation in Istanbul

References

Water supply and sanitation in Turkey
Buildings and structures in Istanbul
Bosphorus
Beykoz
Sarıyer
Tunnels in Istanbul
Water tunnels
Tunnels completed in 2012
Undersea tunnels in Europe
Undersea tunnels in Asia
2012 establishments in Turkey